Kalian Chak railway station is a railway station on Sahibganj loop line under the Malda railway division of Eastern Railway zone. It is situated at Kalian Chak in Sahebganj district in the Indian state of Jharkhand.

References

Railway stations in Sahibganj district
Malda railway division